Sudip Dipen Chatterjee (born 11 November 1991) is an Indian cricketer who plays for Tripura cricket team. He is a left-handed batsman and occasional leg break googly bowler.
Chatterjee has been the mainstay of the Bengal batting line up since making his debut. A prolific scorer in the domestic circuit in all formats, Chatterjee was rewarded with an India A call up for the tour of South Africa 2017.
Chatterjee hails from a middle-class family in Kolkata and is the son of a garment retailer. His wife's name is Papiya Chatterjee.

In July 2018, he was named in the squad for India Green for the 2018–19 Duleep Trophy.

References

External links 
 

1991 births
Living people
Indian cricketers
Bengal cricketers
India Green cricketers
India Red cricketers